Kalleli  is a small village, about 10 kilometres away from Konni (India) in Pathanamthitta district, Kerala, India. It is situated on the banks of river Achankovil.

The main cash crop here is Rubber plantations, had Tea plantations until 3 decades back but gradually discontinued due to slight change of climatic conditions. Also there used to be some paddy fields but over the last few decades that too gave way for Rubber and other crops.

Nearest railway station is Chengannoor, some 30 km away. Trivandrum (Thiruvananthapuram) 100 km and Cochin (K0ochi) 125 km are the nearest airports. 

Achenkovil, the origin of the river Achenkovil is some 28 km away and via Achenkovil, you can reach Chenkottai, Tamil Nadu by cars, jeeps or motorcycles.  There are lot of streams and small water falls in Kalleli and the Reserve forest areas are a thick tropical forest that rolls down to the foot of the hill range.

References 

Villages in Pathanamthitta district